Tipa is a town in Siaha district, Mizoram, India. The famous Pala Lake is situated under Tipa Civil Sub Division. There are two sections of Original Tipa. One section is known as Tipa'B' (Bei vaih) While the other section is known as Viah Vaih (Village constituting the outsiders locally known as 'Viah'). The Mara people are the main inhabitants of Tipa while only 1% of the total population constitutes migrated workers of plain land India.

Geography

Location
Tipa is connected by National Highway 2, which links Dibrugarh, via Imphal. It lies on the route of Kaladan Multi-Modal Transit Transport Project.

References

External links
 Satellite map of Tipa
 About Tuipang

Cities and towns in Saiha district